Tudor Grange Academy may refer to:

 Tudor Grange Academy, Kingshurst
 Tudor Grange Academy, Solihull
 Tudor Grange Academy, Redditch
 Tudor Grange Academy, Worcester